Yūsuke Kumashiro (born 3 June 1988) is a Japanese judoka.

He is the bronze medallist of the 2020 Judo Grand Prix Tel Aviv in the +100 kg category.

References

External links
 

1988 births
Living people
Japanese male judoka
Asian Games medalists in judo
Judoka at the 2014 Asian Games
Asian Games bronze medalists for Japan
Medalists at the 2014 Asian Games
21st-century Japanese people